The Best of 415 Records is a compilation album.

Track listing
Wire Train
1. Chamber of Hellos
2. With God on Our Side
3. She Comes On
Romeo Void
4. A Girl in Trouble
5. Never Say Never
6. Not Safe
Red Rockers
7. China
8. Guns of Revolution
9. Dead Heroes
Translator
10. Everywhere That I'm Not
11. When I Am with You
12. Everywhere
13. I Need You to Love
Until December
14. We Are the Boys
15. Until December
16. Geisha
17. Heaven

1994 compilation albums
Albums produced by David Kahne
Albums produced by Tim Palmer
Albums produced by Ric Ocasek
Albums produced by Ed Stasium
New wave compilation albums
415 Records compilation albums